Jeffreyston (also known as Jeffreston) is a village, parish and community in Pembrokeshire.

Community
As well as Jeffreyston itself, the predominantly rural and agricultural community includes the settlements of Cresselly, Cresswell Quay, Loveston and Yerbeston. In 2011 the community's population was 574.

Cresselly
The name Cresselly probably originated as Croes Elli.

Cresswell Quay
On the Cresswell River which flows into Milford Haven Waterway, Cresswell Quay has been a loading port for coal mined in the area for centuries; remains of the quays can still be seen. The settlement is marked (as Creswel) on a 1578 parish map of Pembrokeshire. To the north, on the left bank of the river, are the ruins of Cresswell Castle.

Loveston
Loveston has its own church. Loveston pit disaster in 1936, in which seven colliers were drowned, brought an end to mining in the area.

Parish
As well as Jeffreyston village, the parish includes the settlements of Cresselly and Cresswell Quay.

The parish church is dedicated to St Jeffrey and St Oswald and is a Grade II* listed building.

Cresselly House in the village of Cresselly is a Grade II* listed Georgian country house built around 1770, seat of the Allen family; it is now a country house hotel and wedding venue.

Site of Special Scientific Interest
Jeffreyston Pastures is a SSSI south of Jeffreyston. It was designated as such in January 1996 in an attempt to protect its fragile biological elements.

School
St Oswald's Church in Wales VA School is in Jeffreyston.

History
Anthracite and coal mining was carried out in the area, first recorded in the 13th century and continuing into the 20th century. Coal was shipped to Sussex from Cresswell Quay, where vessels up to about 80 tons could be loaded.

References

External links
Further historical information and sources on GENUKI

Villages in Pembrokeshire
Communities in Pembrokeshire